Glenella can refer to:

 Municipality of Glenella – Lansdowne, a rural municipality in Manitoba, Canada
 Glenella, Manitoba, an unincorporated community within the rural municipality
 Glenella railway station, a railway station in the rural municipality
 Glenella, Queensland, a town in Australia